The first season of Drag Race Italia premiered on November 18, 2021. The cast was announced on October 28, 2021. The winner of the first season of Drag Race Italia was Elecktra Bionic, becoming the first ever winner in the Drag Race franchise without any maxi-challenge wins, with Farida Kant and Le Riche as runners-up.

Casting occurred in early 2021 with production starting in summer 2021. On June 30, 2021, it was announced that the judges panel will include Italian drag performer Priscilla, actress Chiara Francini and television personality Tommaso Zorzi.

The season consisted of six one-hour episodes.

Contestants 

Ages, names, and cities stated are at time of filming.

Contestant progress

Lip syncs
Legend:

Guest judges
Listed in chronological order:

Cristina D'Avena, singer and actress
, film director
, actor
Vladimir Luxuria, activist, television personality and actress
Nick Cerioni, stylist
Donatella Rettore, singer
, actor
Enzo Miccio, stylist and wedding planner
Coco Rebecca Edogamhe, actress
Ambra Angiolini, singer and actress

Special guests
Guests who appeared in episodes, but did not judge on the main stage.

Episode 3
Tiziano Ferro, singer and songwriter
Andrea Attila Felice, choreographer
Stefano Magnanelli, songwriter

Episode 4
Michele Magani, MAC Cosmetics' global senior artist
Vincenzo De Lucia, comedian and impersonator

Episode 6
Andrea Attila Felice, choreographer
Tommaso Stanzani, dancer
RuPaul, American drag queen and RuPaul's Drag Race host
Michelle Visage, American singer, television personality and RuPaul's Drag Race judge

Episodes
<onlyinclude>

References

2021 in LGBT history
2021 Italian television seasons
Drag Race Italia seasons